Edin Bahtić (born 14 July 1996) is an Austrian professional footballer who plays as a midfielder.

Honours

Club
Lokomotiv Plovdiv
 Bulgarian Cup: 2018–19

References

External links

 

1996 births
Living people
Austrian footballers
Kapfenberger SV players
PFC Lokomotiv Plovdiv players
FC Tsarsko Selo Sofia players
2. Liga (Austria) players
First Professional Football League (Bulgaria) players
Association football midfielders
People from Bruck an der Mur
Footballers from Styria
21st-century Austrian people